Rudra Thandavam may refer to:

 Rudra Thandavam (1978 film)
 Rudra Thandavam (2021 film)

See also 

 Tandava